The 1999 Premier League speedway season was the second division of speedway in the United Kingdom and governed by the Speedway Control Board (SCB), in conjunction with the British Speedway Promoters' Association (BSPA).

Season summary
The League consisted of 13 teams for the 1999 season with the addition of the Swindon Robins who dropped down from the Elite League and a new team, the Workington Comets who replaced the Hull Vikings and the Peterborough Panthers who moved up to the Elite League. 

The League was run on a standard format with no play-offs and was won by Sheffield Tigers.

Final table

Premier League Knockout Cup
The 1999 Premier League Knockout Cup was the 32nd edition of the Knockout Cup for tier two teams. Edinburgh Monarchs were the winners of the competition.

First round

Quarter-finals

Semi-finals

Final

First leg

Second leg

Edinburgh were declared Knockout Cup Champions, winning on aggregate 95–85.

Final leading averages

Riders & final averages
Arena Essex

Leigh Lanham 9.10
Colin White 8.76
Troy Pratt 7.19
Gary Corbett 5.99
Matt Read 5.37
Roger Lobb 5.33
John Wainwright 3.59

Berwick

Scott Lamb 8.65
Mick Powell 8.63
Alan Mogridge 7.05
Claus Kristensen 6.20
David Meldrum 6.09
Tom P. Madsen 6.04
Wesley Waite 4.33
Dean Felton 4.04
Freddie Stephenson 3.35
Phil Pickering 2.27

Edinburgh

Peter Carr 9.59
James Grieves 9.02 
Kevin Little 7.84
Ross Brady 6.99
Blair Scott 5.67
Stewart McDonald 5.32
David McAllan 4.06
Jonathan Swales 2.88
James Birkinshaw 2.52
Justin Elkins 1.91

Exeter

Michael Coles 9.36 
Mark Simmonds 8.03
Graeme Gordon 7.75
Lee Dicken 6.46
Wayne Barrett 5.39
Chris Harris 4.86
Gary Lobb 4.03
Chris Courage 2.24

Glasgow

Paul Bentley 9.76
Les Collins 9.23 
Mick Powell 8.16
Emiliano Sanchez 7.14
Will Beveridge 6.28
Sean Courtney 4.48
Brian Turner 3.59
Stuart Coleman 2.25
Jitendra Duffill 1.36
Scott Courtney 1.14

Isle of Wight

Neville Tatum 8.54
Scott Swain 8.02
Philippe Bergé 7.46
Danny Bird 6.39
Wayne Carter 5.74
Tommy Palmer 5.70
Nick Simmons 4.45
Jeremy Barraud 2.67
Glen Phillips 1.47

Newcastle

Jesper Olsen 9.68 
Robert Eriksson 8.93
David Walsh 8.82
Stuart Swales 7.67
Derrol Keats 5.75
Paul Gould 5.60
Jonathan Swales 3.89
Anthony Barlow 3.55
Steven Jones 3.51

Newport

Craig Watson 9.59 
Anders Henriksson 9.02
Emil Lindqvist 8.86
Frank Smart 8.51
Scott Pegler 6.61
Bjorn Gustafsson 5.58
Chris Neath 5.50
Andrew Appleton 5.47
Bobby Eldridge 3.75

Reading

Petri Kokko 9.42
Dave Mullett 9.04
Per Wester 9.00
Phil Morris 7.49
Paul Clews 5.70
Justin Elkins 5.59
Jarno Kosonen 4.51
Marc Norris 3.83
Shane Colvin 2.35
Peter Collyer 1.81

Sheffield

Sean Wilson 10.56 
Andre Compton 9.00
Scott Smith 8.05
Simon Stead 7.76
Paul Lee 5.96
Simon Cartwright 5.54
Peter Boast 3.69
Adam Allott 3.00

Stoke

Paul Pickering 9.03
Mark Burrows 6.55
Paul Fry 6.47
Tony Atkin 6.21
Jon Armstrong 5.92
Rene Aas 5.01
Rob Clarence 3.51
Wayne Broadhurst 3.41

Swindon

Glenn Cunningham 8.81
Neil Collins 8.13
Steve Masters 7.96
Oliver Allen 5.67
Seemond Stephens 5.45
Steve Bishop 5.16
Krister Marsh 4.92

Workington

Carl Stonehewer 9.92
Brent Werner 7.70
Peter I Karlsson 6.36
Grant MacDonald 6.00
Barry Campbell 5.12
Peter Scully 5.00
Geoff Powell 4.44
Darren Groves 4.34
Wayne Broadhurst 3.07
James Birkinshaw 2.74
Mark Blackwell 2.21

See also
List of United Kingdom Speedway League Champions
Knockout Cup (speedway)

References

Speedway Premier League
1999 in speedway
1999 in British motorsport